Puthur is a village in the taluk of Thrissur in the Thrissur district of Kerala.
It is the location for the upcoming Thrissur Zoological Park Wildlife Conversation & Research Centre park.

References

Villages in Thrissur district